Stra is a town and comune in the Metropolitan City of Venice, Veneto, Italy. It is south of SR11. It is the location of the famed Villa Pisani located on the Brenta canal.

References

External links